Feng Yijun (born February 12, 1997) is an American table tennis player. He competed at the 2016 Summer Olympics in the men's singles event, in which he was eliminated in the first round by He Zhiwen. He attends the University of Georgia from 2016-2017 and recently transferred to New York University, and as part of the American team in the men's team event.

References

1997 births
Living people
American male table tennis players
American sportspeople of Chinese descent
Olympic table tennis players of the United States
Table tennis players at the 2016 Summer Olympics
Table tennis players from Jiangsu
Sportspeople from Nanjing
Naturalised table tennis players